The Platinum Album is the second studio album by Dutch dance group Vengaboys. The album spawned five singles.

In March 2020, the album was re-released to celebrate its 20th anniversary, with the addition of "Take Me to the City", previously only released on the US edition of the album.

Track listing

Standard version

US edition and 2020 digital re-release

Japan version

Singles
"Kiss (When the Sun Don't Shine)" was released as the lead single of the album in late 1999, peaking at number one in RIANZ singles chart and in Polish singles chart in February 2000.
"Shalala Lala" was the second single of the album and peaked at number one on RIANZ chart and in Polish singles chart. It's a cover version of the song by Danish glam rock band Walkers, originally released in their Greatest Hits album in 1973.
"Uncle John from Jamaica" was the third single of the album with less successful single like previous two but it was a Top Ten single in 4 countries: Netherlands, United Kingdom, New Zealand and Poland.
"Cheekah Bow Bow (That Computer Song)" was released as the fourth single of the album, including the fifth virtual band member, "Cheekah". It peaked at 19 in UK Singles Chart and 14 in Polish singles chart.
"Forever as One" was released as the fifth single of the album but it was their worst single performance, peaking at 29 on UK Singles Chart.

Charts

Weekly charts

Year-end charts

Certifications

References

2000 albums
Vengaboys albums